Isaiah Dwayne Hicks (born July 24, 1994) is an American professional basketball player for San-en NeoPhoenix of the B.League. He played college basketball for the North Carolina Tar Heels.

High school and college career

In his senior season at J. F. Webb High School, he was named to the 2013 McDonald's All-American Boys Game roster. He committed to North Carolina.

At the conclusion of his junior season, he received the ACC's Sixth Man of the Year Award. He scored 17 points in UNC's 103–64 win over Texas Southern in the first round of the NCAA tournament, but afterward  averaged six points per game and did not score in double figures in UNC's last four games. Hicks scored 13 points and had 9 rebounds in the Tar Heels victory over Gonzaga in the 2017 National Championship game.

Professional career

New York Knicks (2017–2019)
After going undrafted in the 2017 NBA draft, Hicks was signed by the Charlotte Hornets to their training camp roster. He was released on October 13, 2017, as one of the team's final preseason roster cuts.

On October 20, 2017, he signed  a two-way contract with the New York Knicks via their NBA G League affiliate the Westchester Knicks. Hicks made his NBA debut on February 8, 2018, against the Toronto Raptors. Hicks would sign a second two-way contract with the Knicks on July 3.

On June 30, 2019, Hicks signed with the Hornets for the summer league.

BC Avtodor (2019–2020)
On August 3, 2019, Hicks signed with Russian team BC Avtodor of the VTB United League. He averaged 12.8 points and 6.7 rebounds per game in the VTB League.

Seoul Samsung Thunders (2020–present)
On July 16, 2020, Hicks signed with Seoul Samsung Thunders of the Korean Basketball League.

Career statistics

NBA

Regular season

|-
| style="text-align:left;"| 
| style="text-align:left;"| New York
| 18 || 0 || 13.3 || .458 || .222 || .667 || 2.3 || .9 || .1 || .2 || 4.4
|-
| style="text-align:left;"| 
| style="text-align:left;"| New York
| 3 || 0 || 10.7 || .500 || – || .800 || 2.3 || .7 || .3 || 1.0 || 4.0
|-
| style="text-align:center;" colspan="2"| Career
| 21 || 0 || 13.0 || .463 || .222 || .696 || 2.3 || .9 || .1 || .3 || 4.4

College

|-
| style="text-align:left;"| 2013–14
| style="text-align:left;"| North Carolina
| 34 || 0 || 7.3 || .417 || .200 || .579 || 1.0 || .2 || .1 || .4 || 1.2
|-
| style="text-align:left;"| 2014–15
| style="text-align:left;"| North Carolina
| 38 || 3 || 14.8 || .544 || .000 || .621 || 3.0 || .3 || .2 || .4 || 6.6
|-
| style="text-align:left;"| 2015–16
| style="text-align:left;"| North Carolina
| 40 || 3 || 18.1 || .619 || – || .756 || 4.6 || .7 || .5 || .6 || 9.2
|-
| style="text-align:left;"| 2016–17
| style="text-align:left;"| North Carolina
| 39 || 39 || 23.3 || .576 || – || .779 || 5.5 || 1.4 || .4 || .7 || 11.8
|- class="sortbottom"
| style="text-align:center;" colspan="2"| Career
| 151 || 45 || 16.2 || .573 || .167 || .725 || 3.6 || .7 || .3 || .5 || 7.4

References

External links
North Carolina Tar Heels bio

1994 births
Living people
21st-century African-American sportspeople
African-American basketball players
American expatriate basketball people in Russia
American expatriate basketball people in South Korea
American men's basketball players
Basketball players from North Carolina
BC Avtodor Saratov players
McDonald's High School All-Americans
New York Knicks players
North Carolina Tar Heels men's basketball players
Parade High School All-Americans (boys' basketball)
People from Oxford, North Carolina
Power forwards (basketball)
Seoul Samsung Thunders players
Undrafted National Basketball Association players
United States men's national basketball team players
Westchester Knicks players